The Chiming Fountain, also known as Cupid's Fountain, the John Staehli Fountain, Portland's City Park Fountain and Washington Park Fountain, is an outdoor cast iron fountain and sculpture built in 1891 by John "Hans" Staehli. It is installed in Washington Park in Portland, Oregon, United States. The fountain's name derives from the sound made when water drips from the upper basin. Staehli designed the fountain to serve as a watering trough for horses pulling carriages into the park. Based on a Renaissance fountain, it was originally painted white and included a statuette of a boy, possibly depicting Cupid, though the figure was damaged and permanently removed from the sculpture before or during the 1940s.

The fountain was restored in 1960, but no longer functioned. Its condition was deemed "treatment urgent" by the Smithsonian Institution's "Save Outdoor Sculpture!" program in February 1994. Since then, its water-pumping function has also been restored. Chiming Fountain has been included in published biking and walking tours of Portland and has been mentioned as a highlight of Washington Park in guides recommending family-friendly activities in the city.

Description and history
The decorative fountain is located at the junction of Southwest Sacajawea Boulevard and Southwest Sherwood Boulevard in the main circle of Washington Park. It was designed by John "Hans" Staehli, a woodcarver from Switzerland who immigrated to Portland and was known for his decorative carvings of churches. The fountain was commissioned by the city in 1891 for $400 and completed by Staehli later that year, becoming the city's second piece of public art. It served as a watering trough for horses pulling carriages into the park. The fountain has been given many different names, but is most commonly referred to as Chiming Fountain, in reference to the sound made by water dripping from the upper basin.

It has a pedestal and two round bronze basins separated by a narrow post, and stands in an octagonal concrete base which served as a retaining pool. The pedestal has four horned gargoyle-like figures. On the bottom of the pedestal's west side is an unsigned inscription which reads: "J. Staehli/Portland, Org./64 Second St."

Staehli's design is based on a Renaissance fountain and was originally painted white. The central post originally held a figure of a boy carrying a staff (or possibly a fish or a torch) from which water spouted. Some sources suggest the figure depicted Cupid, hence one of the fountain's nicknames, "Cupid's Fountain". According to Portland Parks & Recreation, the figure was last recorded in 1912 in a photograph of Willis McElroy's band in the nearby bandstand. However, in the 1920s, freezing weather expanded water in the fountain, damaging the figure. The boy statuette was removed from the fountain and discarded by the 1940s, and it was not replaced.

The city planned to remove the fountain in 1960 due to disrepair. However, Mayor Terry Schrunk instructed the parks bureau to begin a restoration after Francis J. Murnane, a local longshoreman and advocate for historic preservation, appealed its removal. Much of its original decoration was absent, so replicas of existing pieces were constructed at a cost of $450. The restoration cost around $1,775, including assembly and installation. Despite its restoration, the fountain was no longer functional. Its condition was deemed "treatment urgent" by the Smithsonian Institution's "Save Outdoor Sculpture!" program in February 1994. Since then, the fountain's plumbing has been restored. According to Smithsonian, the fountain is administered by the City of Portland's Metropolitan Arts Commission.

Reception
The fountain has been included in published biking and walking tours of the city, including one which described it as "elegant". It was also mentioned as a highlight of Washington Park in the 2010 guidebook Best Places: Portland and by Delta Sky Magazine. Similarly, Chiming Fountain has been included in descriptions of the park in guides recommending child-friendly activities and sites in the city. These guides include the website TravelforKids.com and the 2009 book The 10 Best of Everything Families: An Ultimate Guide for Travelers, which listed Washington Park as one of the ten "Best Parks and Playgrounds" in the Northwestern United States.

See also

 1891 in art
 Drinking fountains in the United States

References

External links

 

1891 establishments in Oregon
1891 sculptures
Bronze sculptures in Oregon
Cast-iron architecture in the United States
Cast-iron sculptures
Concrete sculptures in Oregon
Drinking fountains in Oregon
Fountains in Portland, Oregon
Iron sculptures in the United States
Outdoor sculptures in Portland, Oregon
Sculptures by American artists
Sculptures of children in Oregon
Sculptures of Cupid
Washington Park (Portland, Oregon)
Works by Swiss people